Current is a 1992 Indian drama film. The film was co-written and directed by K. Hariharan, in his Hindi cinema debut, for the National Film Development Corporation of India. Starring Om Puri and Deepti Naval in the lead, the film focused on the plight of a farmer in rural India. The plot of the movie was based on a short story written by sahitya-akademi winner Ki. Rajanarayanan.

Plot
The film reveals the life and struggle of a farmer, who is tired of dealing with the corrupt systems in bureaucracy and politics at that time in India.

Cast
Om Puri
Deepti Naval
Shreeram Lagoo
Savita Prabhune as Radha
Achyut Potdar
Deepak Qazir

References

External links

1992 films
1990s Hindi-language films